Norio Fujimura (born 14 November 1914, date of death unknown) was a Japanese sailor. He competed in the O-Jolle event at the 1936 Summer Olympics.

References

External links
 

1914 births
Year of death missing
Japanese male sailors (sport)
Olympic sailors of Japan
Sailors at the 1936 Summer Olympics – O-Jolle
Place of birth missing